Medellin, a City in western Colombia; important coffee center has returned its tramway as a modern tram system.

Medellin once had a standard steel wheeled tramway network. Like most cities in the world, it first was started as horse tram, and finally electric tram. The tram service was completely stopped in 1951. Trams returned to Medellin in 2015.

History

A horse tramway was opened at Medellin in 1887. Horse-drawn trams began carrying passengers along Carrera 52, between Plazuela de la Veracruz (near Parque Berrío) and El Edén, on 23 January 1887. It was short lived, and ultimately closed in 1897.and later the it was planned for electrification. The Americans started electrification in 24 June 1920, and finally electric tramway opened in 12 October 1921. From Parque Berrío to América opened to traffic. Track gauge of the electric tramway was 914 mm / 36 in, the same used by the steam railroads. Routes were gradually constructed towards Sucre, Buenos Aires, Envigado, Belen, Berlin, Arenjue Hill etc. The entire network was single tracked (with some crossing loops), cars were single coach. In 1945 the network reached its maximum extent with 45 Kilometers of tracks with 61 trams.

Decline started after the 2nd World War. Damage and traffic congestion also grew rapidly. Starting of bus & taxi service grew very rapidly. The number of private cars also increased very much, and especially many streets, which were ideal for tram, now started becoming congested by motor vehicles. Tramcars were not modernized for many decades, and basically the 1930s electric cars were still running in the 1950s. In that time gasoline buses started faster & had smoother journeys with modern buses, whereas trams were still slower, single coach and many backdated features like trolley pole etc., so they looked very outdated. Under maintenance of tracks caused some derailments and bumpy rides, which were not liked by commuters. A network of single-track lines with turn-outs was no longer adequate for a rapidly growing city, and for this program, many streets were necessary for widening. The transport authority thought that a slow tram transport with fast bus transport will cause many problems for smoother city transportation, although the tram tracks were on the side of the streets, but they were not interested to double the tracks. The tramway had little comfort and was slow because it was caught in the traffic jam caused by the cars, buses etc. The tracks were also outdated and noisy. Another main problem was the city was not built on plains, and had an steep grade on their main streets, which was a problem for old steel wheeled trams, where increasing of speed was not possible. Despite this, routes which were on reserved track and steep grade were survived, and all routes which were on unreserved street section and plain lands were closed. By justifying all ways, the transport department decided to close the tram network and replace it with trolleybus service. The last tram ran on 7 October 1951.

Trolleybus service was even started before closure of the tram network. Tranvía Municipal de Medellín purchased two trolleybuses from Ransomes, Sims & Jefferies in England in 1928 and opened a line to Los Ángeles on 12 October 1929. It later bought more trolleybuses, built its own trolleybuses, and opened a second line to La Toma in 1934.

After closing the tram network in the early '50s, the people of Medellin thought the only unfashionable obstacle of smooth city traveling has been removed, and the city could move faster than before, but it proved false some years later. Uncontrolled increasing of petrol vehicles like buses, taxis, and private cars started choking the streets of Medellin. Like most South American countries, Colombia suffered many problems of developing countries, including pollution, traffic jams, illegal migration, low literacy and booming increasing of population etc. Increase in population started increasing urbanization of Medellin, and it started increasing motor vehicles, which started increasing air & sound pollution, traffic jams & smog. Starting at the early '60s, all these problems were present and at the mid '90s, inhabitants of Medellin finally realized that non-controlling of motor vehicles & closure of the tram was a great mistake. Although trolleybus is also a pollution free transportation, maintenance of that system was even higher than tram, because, it ran on rubber tires, which damages faster than iron wheels.

A metro system opened in 1995, using a small part of the former tram network, and gradually two metro routes were constructed. But for low density area, this was not an ideal solution, so metro was not extended throughout Medellin.

Many cities around the world like Tunis, Algiers, Sydney, Buenos Aires, Shanghai, Shenyang, Tianjin, Dublin, Edinburgh, Athens, Bergen, etc. also understood that error, and like them Medellin also planned for the return of tram.

Downtown Medellin was already served by metro, but the transportation in eastern Medellin was not sufficient. So the transport authority decided to construct it around Miraflores area in 2015, which is in the eastern side of the main city.

Timeline

1887 - Horse tram started on 23 January.
1921 - Electric tram started running from 12 October.
1945 - Seventeen routes opened as a maximum extension of the tram network.
1951 - The last tram ran on 7 October.
2015 - Tram returned as a modern system.

Tram routes

Fleet

All tramcars were single coach and bi directional, drawing electricity by trolley-pole. Twelve 2-axle "Birney Safety Cars" from J. G. Brill Co. in Philadelphia started electric tram operation, TMM built 10 more tram routes and purchased 52 more Birney cars from Brill in the 1920s: 6 in 1923, 7 in 1924, 2 in 1925, 9 in 1926, 14 in 1927 and 14 in 1928. Six of the cars purchased in 1928 were large 4-axle models. However, after that the tramway had very little upgrade and basically the 1930s electric cars were still running in the 1950s. These vehicles looked outdated compared to the new cars and buses that were then on the streets. That was one of the strong reasons of the closure of the system.

Depots & termini

Berlin, Campo Verdes, Robledo, Estación Villa, Sucre, San Javier, Salvador, Gerona, Buenos Aires, Belen, and Envigado were some of the termini. The tram depot was on Calle 50.

Alignment

Most tram routes were on unreserved tracks and on the side of roads. The route towards Envigado and Berlin was almost completely on reserved track, so it offered high speed service. Tramcars were caught in the traffic jams caused by the cars, and single track was the main obstacle for a hassle free service. The tracks were also outdated, noisy and not maintained properly. Those were some other strong reasons of the closure of the system.

See also
 Ayacucho Tram - The second generation modern tram in Medellin that was opened in 2016.
 Medellin Metro - The Metro System of Medellin that was opened in 1995 and is currently the only metro system in Colombia.

External links

Old photos of Medellin tram - http://www.tramz.com/co/me/me.html

Tram transport in Colombia